The Country Club Historic District is a suburban residential district established in 1922 in Edina, Minnesota, United States.  It was one of Minnesota's first comprehensive planned communities and served as the prototype for subsequent town planning in this suburb of Minneapolis.  The development was modeled after the J.C. Nichols Country Club District in Kansas City, Missouri.

The district is also noted for its homogeneous Period Revival architecture.  The architectural styles are primarily Colonial Revival, Tudor Revival, Georgian Revival and Mediterranean Revival designs. The neighborhood is listed in the National Register of Historic Places with 550 contributing properties mostly built 1924–1931.  It was listing for having local significance in architecture, community planning, and landscape architecture.

See also
 National Register of Historic Places listings in Hennepin County, Minnesota

References

External links
 City of Edina Heritage Preservation Board: The City of Edina's Historic Country Club District
  The Historic Significance of the Country Club District
  National Register of Historic Places, Nomination Form, 1982

Edina, Minnesota
Houses in Hennepin County, Minnesota
Houses on the National Register of Historic Places in Minnesota
Historic districts on the National Register of Historic Places in Minnesota
National Register of Historic Places in Hennepin County, Minnesota